Terry Tate (born 4 April 1943) is a former  Australian rules footballer who played with Geelong and South Melbourne in the Victorian Football League (VFL).

Notes

External links 

Living people
1943 births
Australian rules footballers from Victoria (Australia)
Geelong Football Club players
Sydney Swans players
Coragulac Football Club players